Deutsche Bachsolisten (DBS) (The German Bach Soloists) is a German Baroque chamber orchestra dedicated to the works of J.S. Bach. It was established by German conductor and oboist, Helmut Winschermann in 1960.

References
 Bachsolisten 1973 photo, on Southern Africa tour organised by Hans Adler.

German orchestras
Bach orchestras
Musical groups established in 1960
1960 establishments in Germany